This is a list of Keralites who have represented India in the Olympic Games.

List of Kerala Olympians

References 

Olympians
Kerala, List of Olympians
 
Olympians, Kerala
Olympians
Kerala, List of Olympians